Bayaguana FC is a football team based in Bayaguana, Dominican Republic. Currently playing in the Liga Dominicana de Fútbol from 2018.

Stadium
Currently the team plays at the 1000 capacity Estadio Bayaguana.

References

External links
Soccerway
Sports Opera

Football clubs in the Dominican Republic